Tracks is a 1970 album by Oscar Peterson.

Track listing
 "Give Me the Simple Life" (Rube Bloom, Harry Ruby) – 3:59
 "Basin Street Blues" (Spencer Williams) – 4:14
 "Honeysuckle Rose" (Andy Razaf, Fats Waller) – 3:05
 "Dancing on the Ceiling" (Lorenz Hart, Richard Rodgers) – 5:07
 "A Child Is Born" (Thad Jones) – 2:35
 "If I Should Lose You" (Ralph Rainger, Leo Robin) – 5:19
 "A Little Jazz Exercise" (Oscar Peterson) – 2:43
 "Django" (John Lewis) – 5:16
 "Ja-Da" (Bob Carleton) – 4:17
 "Just a Gigolo" (Julius Brammer, Irving Caesar, Leonello Casucci) – 5:27

Analysis
 "Give Me the Simple Life" starts the album with a [block chord] technique.  
 "Basin Street Blues" is a slow stride addition to the album
 "Honeysuckle Rose" utilizes an up-tempo rendition of the original song
 "Dancing on the Ceiling"  is the second slow-stride addition to the album, 
 "A Child Is Born" is a slow ballade-style setting, stating the melody, then improvising slightly on that melody.
 If I Should Lose You" the improvisation is approached in a similar way to Basin Street Blues
 "A Little Jazz Exercise" is the only original composition by Oscar Peterson.  It is similar in structure to the "I've Got Rhythm" chord changes.
 "Django" begins very close to the original version, and veers off into a Db improvisation 
 "Ja-Da" continues the slow stride technique started by track #1, 4, & 6
 "Just a Gigolo another slow stride interpretation.

Personnel

Performance
 Oscar Peterson - piano

Production
 Willi Fruth - recording director
 Stefan Kassel - artwork, series design
 Matthias Kunnecke - producer
 Gene Lees - liner notes
 Richard Palmer
 Willem Makkee - digital remastering
 Hubertus Mall - artwork, cover illustration

References

1970 albums
Oscar Peterson albums
MPS Records albums